Pleasant Run was a hamlet in Readington Township, Hunterdon County, New Jersey, United States. Located along Campbell's Brook (now also called Pleasant Run), the hamlet consisted of farms, a schoolhouse and a general store.  The brook was named after John Campbell, who purchased the land around it in 1685.

References

Unincorporated communities in Readington Township, New Jersey
Unincorporated communities in Hunterdon County, New Jersey
Unincorporated communities in New Jersey